St. John on Patmos  is an oil on panel painting by Hieronymus Bosch, created c. 1489. The painting is held in the Gemäldegalerie, in Berlin, Germany. The reverse is also painted, the title of that picture is Scenes from the Passion of Christ and the Pelican with Her Young.

Related work
St. John the Evangelist on Patmos forms a pair with St. John the Baptist in the Wilderness, which is in Madrid.  It was noted in the 1940s that the two paintings may have been designed as wings of an altarpiece.  Such an origin would explain the grisaille painting on the reverse, as it is characteristic of polyptychs to have both sides of folding panels decorated. It has since been suggested that the altarpiece in question was an artwork which is known to have been made for St. John's Cathedral, 's-Hertogenbosch.

The painting is difficult to date. If the 's-Hertogenbosch hypothesis is correct, the date would be around 1489, although later dates have been proposed based on other criteria.

See also
 John of Patmos

References
Ian Boxall. Patmos in the Reception History of the Apocalypse. Oxford University Press, Apr 18, 2013 pg. 197

1490s paintings
Paintings by Hieronymus Bosch
Paintings in the Gemäldegalerie, Berlin
Bosch
Angels in art
Birds in art
Books in art
Paintings depicting the Crucifixion of Jesus
Paintings depicting the Passion of Jesus